Charles or Charlie Atkinson may refer to: 
 Charles Joseph Atkinson (born 1941), British boxer, fight promoter and trainer
 Charles Atkinson-Grimshaw (1877–1933), English footballer
 Charlie Atkinson (footballer) (1932–2010), English footballer
 Charlie Atkinson (rugby union) (born 2001), English rugby union player
 Chick Atkinson (Charles L. Atkinson, 1918–1962), American football coach